The India women's cricket team toured England during the 2014 season where they defeated England in a one-off Test. This was India's first Test since 2006 and their second victory against England.

There was also a three match ODI series which was the part of the 2014–16 ICC Women's Championship. England won the series 2–0 as the third match was washed out.

Squads

Tour Match

Test series

Only Test

ODI series

1st ODI

2nd ODI

3rd ODI

References

Further reading

External links 
 ESPN Cricinfo:Fixtures and Results
 ICC Women's Championship
 Series Results
 ESPN Cricinfo: points system retained
 Why wasn't England v India a multi-format points series?

2014 in women's cricket
2014 in English women's cricket
England 2014
2014–16 ICC Women's Championship
India 2014
2014–15 Indian women's cricket